Torben Hundahl (16 June 1945 — 2 October 1989), sometimes credited as Torben Hundal, was a Danish film and television actor.

Career

Partial filmography

 Dangerous Summer (1969)
 Tintomara (1970)
 The Happiness Cage (1972)
 Revolutionen i Vandkanten (1972)
 The Vicar of Vejlby (1972)
 Z.P.G. (1972)
 The Escape (1973)
 Kun Sandheden (1975)
 The Gangster's Apprentice (1976)
 Hvem Myrder Hvem? (1978)
 Lille Spejl (1978)
 Krigernes Børn (1979)
 Kidnapning (1982)

Partial television work

 Mildest talt (1969)
 Ved du Hvad du Skulle? Gifte Dig Med Tulle! (1970)
 Jonas (1971)
 Hvornår dør Maria? (1972)
 Privatlivets Fred (1973)
 Crash (1984)

References

External links
 
 Torben Hundahl at danskefilm.dk (in Danish language)

1945 births
1989 deaths
Danish male film actors
Danish male television actors
20th-century Danish male actors